Monadh Mòr (Scottish Gaelic: Big Hill) is a mountain in the Cairngorms region of the Highlands of Scotland. A pass connects it with Beinn Bhrotain.

See also 
 Ben Nevis
 List of Munro mountains
 Mountains and hills of Scotland

References

External links 
 Mondah Mor - munromagic.com

Munros
Mountains and hills of the Cairngorms
One-thousanders of Scotland